

See also 
 Lists of fossiliferous stratigraphic units in Europe

References 
 

 Slovakia
Geologic formations of Slovakia
Fossiliferous stratigraphic units
Fossiliferous stratigraphic units